The Vocabulario trilingüe (Spanish for "trilingual vocabulary"; Ayer MS 1478) is an anonymous 16th-century manuscript copy of the second edition (1516) of Antonio de Nebrija's Spanish-Latin dictionary, which has been expanded by the addition of Nahuatl translations of its entries in red ink. The manuscript is currently held by the Newberry Library in Chicago, Illinois, United States.

References

* 

Nahuatl dictionaries and grammars
Spanish words and phrases
16th-century books